Aravatagi is a village in Dharwad district of Karnataka, India.

Demographics
As of the 2011 Census of India there were 240 households in Aravatagi and a total population of 1,064 consisting of 527 males and 537 females. There were 128 children ages 0-6.

References

Villages in Dharwad district